Matthew Kennard (born 12 February 1982) is an English television actor, best known for his role as nurse Archie Hallam in the BBC One soap opera Doctors.

Career
Kennard was born in Grimsby, Humberside, and has played roles in soap operas including Coronation Street, Hollyoaks and Doctors. He also starred as Manchester United footballer Duncan Edwards in a BBC dramatisation of the 1958 Munich air disaster. One of Kennard's earlier roles was in the series Love in the 21st Century, broadcast on Channel 4 in 1999 and created by Red Productions, who were previously responsible for Queer as Folk. Kennard's character is seduced by a school teacher who believes she is giving him experience, although it later transpires he had made a bet that he could sleep with her.

Kennard left a regular role in the soap opera, Doctors, on 27 April 2009, to concentrate on film work, including featuring in Born of Hope with his brother Sam.

He appeared in the seventh series of Waterloo Road as Craig O'Leary, he played a con-man who pretended to be interested in Janeece Bryant (Chelsee Healey).

Kennard appeared as Dave Schmidt in the film Bula Quo!, released in 2013. That same year, he had a short stint in Emmerdale as shady businessman Kirk Stoker.

In 2015, Kennard and his twin brother Sam played twin brothers David and Gabriel Meyer in the BBC TV series WPC 56. He appeared in CBBC's The Dumping Ground in 2016.

Personal life
Kennard has a twin brother Sam, who is also an actor. He is married to actress Laura Aikman.

References

External links
 

1982 births
Living people
British identical twins
English male television actors
Identical twin male actors
Male actors from London
Male actors from Lincolnshire
People from Grimsby
English twins